This is a list of all-time minor league affiliates for the Philadelphia Flyers of the National Hockey League (NHL). The Philadelphia Phantoms for 13 seasons (1996–97 to 2008–09) and the Hershey Bears for 12 seasons (1984–85 to 1995–96) are the only teams to serve as a Flyers affiliate for more than ten years. The Flyers are currently affiliated with the Lehigh Valley Phantoms of the American Hockey League (AHL) and the Reading Royals of the ECHL.

Affiliates
 League champions

Notes

References
General

 
 

Specific

 
minor league affiliates